The fifty-fourth Connecticut House of Representatives district elects one member of the Connecticut House of Representatives. Its current representative is Democrat Gregory Haddad. The district consists the towns of Mansfield, which includes the Storrs campus of the University of Connecticut, and Chaplin, which was added to the district in 2001.

List of representatives

Recent elections

External links 
 Google Maps - Connecticut House Districts

References

54